The Dublin Accord is an agreement for the international recognition of Engineering Technician qualifications.
  	
In May 2002, the national engineering organisations of Ireland, the United Kingdom, South Africa and Canada signed an agreement mutually recognising the qualifications which underpin the granting of Engineering Technician titles in the four countries. Operation of the Dublin Accord is similar as for the Washington Accord and Sydney Accord.

Signatories
Each signatory has full rights of participation in the Accord.
Australia - (Engineers Australia, 2013)
Canada - (Canadian Council of Technicians and Technologists, 2002)
Ireland - (Engineers Ireland, 2002)
Korea - (Accreditation Board for Engineering Education of Korea, 2013)
Malaysia - (Board of Engineers Malaysia, 2018)
New Zealand - (Institution of Professional Engineers New Zealand, 2013)
South Africa - (Engineering Council of South Africa, 2002)
United Kingdom - (Engineering Council UK, 2002)
United States - (ABET, 2013)

See also
 Seoul Accord - computing and information technology
 Outcome-based education
 Chartered Engineer
 Professional Engineer

References

External links
 International Engineering Alliance Dublin Accord website

Professional titles and certifications
Engineering education